Christina Wolfe, credited earlier in her career as Christina Ulfsparre, is an English actress. She voiced and portrayed Robyn in the 2015 video game Need for Speed, and played the recurring roles of Kathryn Davis in the television series The Royals, and Julia Pennyworth in The CW television series Batwoman. She portrayed Kate in 2022 Netflix film The Weekend Away. In 2023, she starred as Cat Brandice in the Syfy science-fiction television series The Ark.

Early life and education
Wolfe attended Durham University and studied English and Philosophy. She also trained at Drama Studio London.

Career
Wolfe played Kathryn Davis on The Royals, which ran for three seasons on E! Her character was involved with princes Liam and Robert. The series ended on a cliffhanger, with Wolfe's character being kidnapped and pregnant with Liam's baby.

She next appeared on The CW series Batwoman as Julia Pennyworth, the daughter of Alfred Pennyworth.

Wolfe appears in the 2022 Netflix film The Weekend Away in a prominent role. Wolfe plays Kate, a woman who convinces her best friend Beth (Leighton Meester) to travel to Croatia for a weekend getaway. However, when Kate goes missing, Beth is forced to figure out what happened to her. The film was released on Netflix on 3 March 2022.

Filmography

Film

Television

Video games
 Need for Speed (2015), as Robyn (voice and live-action cutscenes)

References

External links

Living people
English film actresses
English television actresses
21st-century English actresses
Alumni of Durham University
Alumni of the Drama Studio London
1989 births